= International University of Professional Studies =

Coordinates: 20.8354°N 156.3324°W

The International University of Professional Studies is an unaccredited, distance education school located in Maui, Hawaii. The school offers Masters and Doctoral level degrees in a variety of topics, including psychology and spirituality. In 2002, the school was sued by Hawaii's Office of Consumer Protection, and it entered into a stipulated final judgment in 2003.

== Legal action ==
In 2002, Hawaii's Office of Consumer Protection filed a complaint against IUPS seeking to enjoin alleged violations of Hawaii consumer-protection laws. The complaint included allegations that IUPS suggested that Hawaii licensed, approved of, or regulated its operations. On August 7, 2003, a stipulated final judgment enjoined IUPS for one year from suggesting that Hawaii licensed, approved of, or regulated its operations and required it to pay $1,500 to the Office of Consumer Protection for attorneys' fees and investigation costs.
